Brazilian singer and songwriter Claudia Leitte has released one studio album, three live album, two compilation albums, two EPs, two promotional albums, and 48 singles (including twelve as a featured artist and eleven promotional singles). She has sold 3 million records as solo artist, and a further 6 million with Babado Novo.

Album

Studio albums

Live albums

Compilation albums

EPs

Video albums

Singles

As lead artist

As featured artist

Promotional singles

References

Discographies of Brazilian artists
Pop music discographies
Discography
Latin music discographies